The Ravin 500 is a South African amateur-built aircraft, designed and produced by Ravin Aircraft of Pretoria. The aircraft first flew on 15 September 2002 and is supplied as a kit for amateur construction or as a complete ready-to-fly aircraft.

Design and development
The Ravin 500 is based on the design of the aluminum Piper PA-24 Comanche, but rendered in composite materials and scaled down some 6–7%.

The Ravin 500 features a cantilever low-wing, a four-seat enclosed cabin, accessed by doors, retractable tricycle landing gear and a single engine in tractor configuration.

The aircraft's recommended engine is the  Lycoming IO-540 four-stroke powerplant. Construction time from the supplied kit is estimated as 1400 hours.

Operational history
The company reported that by December 2013 that a total of 22 aircraft or kits had been supplied and that 17 of these have been completed and flown.

Specifications (Ravin 500)

References

External links

Homebuilt aircraft
Single-engined tractor aircraft